Anbargah (also Romanized as Anbārgāh) is a village in Lishtar Rural District, in the Central District of Gachsaran County, Kohgiluyeh and Boyer-Ahmad Province, Iran. At the 2006 census, its population was 129, in 23 families.

References 

Populated places in Gachsaran County